Want A Taste? is a South Korean television series starring Shim Yi-young, Seo Do-young and Seo Ha-joon. It aired daily on SBS TV from November 12, 2019 to May 1, 2020 at 8:35 a.m. (KST) time slot for 124 episodes.

Plot
Hae-Jin (Shim Yi-Young) is 36-years-old. She is married to Jin-Sang (Seo Ha-Jun), who is 6 years younger than her, and they have a daughter Yoo-Ri (Shin Bi). Hae-Jin runs a restaurant that she took over from her father-in-law. She supported her husband Jin-Sang while he studied to enter a university. Because of Hae-Jin, Jin-Sang is now attending a prestigious university, but he has an affair with Joo-Ri (Han Ga-Rim). She is the young daughter of a rich family. Hae-Jin becomes aware of her husband's affair, but she doesn't want a divorce. Meanwhile, Dae-Gu (Seo Do-Young) appears in front Hae-Jin. Dae-Gu is a drama series writer. He was once in demand for his screenwriting, but his popularity has waned. His marriage life is not doing well either.

Cast

Main
 Shim Yi-young as Kang Hae-jin
 Seo Do-young as Oh Dae-gu
 Seo Ha-joon as Lee Jin-sang
 Han Ga-rim as Jung Joo-ri
 Lee Seul-ah as Bae Yoo-ram
 Choi Woo-seok as Jung Joon-ho

Supporting
 Lee Duk-hee as Oh Ok-bun
 Song In-guk as Kang Cheol-jin
 Shin Bi as Lee Yoo-ri
 Lim Chae-mu as Lee Baek-soo
 Ahn Ye-in as Lee Jin-bong
 Kim Jung-hwa as Han Jeong-won
 Lee Hyun-kyung as Do Yeon-gyeong

Others
 Jang Seon-yul as Oh Gwang-ju
 Heo Cham as Heo Eui-ruo
 Lee Jong-gu as Han Dong-san
 Seo Sang-won
 Park Seong-chan
 Lee Chan-hee
 Lee Cho-won
 Ahm Ji-hun
 Hong Seung-bum
 Jung Yi-rang
 Ok Ju-ri
 Eunmi Jeon
 Byun Gun-woo
 Hur Soo-jung
 Jung Hyeon-cheol
 Oda-eun
 Yang Jeong-su
 Kyung Kang-moon
 Lee Sook
 Kim Jung-soo

Special appearances
 Hwang Myung-hwan
 Chu Gwi-jeong
 Shim Ji-ho
 Yeon Do-yeon

Production
Want A Taste? was initially planned as an evening daily drama, airing Monday to Friday 7:20 p.m., replacing Bubbly Lovely in June 2017. It was supposed to star Lee Tae-ran, Ryu Jin, Shim Ji-ho, Han Bo-reum, and Hwang Ji-hyun in the roles of Kang Hae-jin (Shim Yi-young), Oh Dae-gu (Seo Do-young), Lee Jin-sang (Seo Ha-joon), Jung Joo-ri  (Han Ga-rim) and Bae Yoo-ram (Lee Seul-ah), respectively. However, due to the financial losses and the low ratings of You Are a Gift and Bubbly Lovely (average of 7.6% and 7.8%, respectively), SBS decided to cancel the timeslot. It was revived as a morning daily drama airing Monday to Friday 8:35 a.m. more than two years later, with Kim Do-hyun still being the writer but with the cast being totally replaced.

Ratings
 In this table,  represent the lowest ratings and  represent the highest ratings.
 N/A denotes that the rating is not known.

Notes

References

External links
  
 

Seoul Broadcasting System television dramas
2019 South Korean television series debuts
Korean-language television shows
2020 South Korean television series endings
Television series by Celltrion Entertainment